Pogled (Serbian Cyrillic: Поглед, Albanian: Pogledi) is a mountain peak situated on the border between Kosovo and Serbia. With an elevation of 2,156 meters, it is the highest peak of Mokra Gora which is part of the Prokletije. Pogled is just east of the second highest peak on Mokra Gora, Beleg.

See also 

Geography of Montenegro
Geography of Serbia
Geography of Kosovo

Notes

References         

Accursed Mountains
Two-thousanders of Serbia
Two-thousanders of Kosovo
Two-thousanders of Montenegro
Montenegro–Serbia border